(village in Kirinyaga County.)

Kathangarari is a settlement in Kenya's Kirinyagaga county.

References 

Kirinyaga County

Populated places in Eastern Province (Kenya)